The 2011 Men's EuroHockey Championship IV was the fourth edition of the EuroHockey Championship IV, the fourth level of the men's European field hockey championships organized by the European Hockey Federation. It was held in Athens, Greece from 2 to 7 August 2011.

Turkey won their first EuroHockey Championship IV title and were promoted to EuroHockey Championship III.

Results

Standings

Matches

See also
2011 Men's EuroHockey Championship III

References

EuroHockey Championship IV
Men 4
EuroHockey Championship IV
EuroHockey Championship IV
International field hockey competitions hosted by Greece
Sports competitions in Athens
2010s in Athens